WDB or wdb may refer to:
 .wdb is the Microsoft Works database file extension
 William Denis Browne (1888–1915), a British composer, pianist, organist and music critic of the early 20th century
 Women's Development Bank, a woman's services organization in Venezuela
 Wondabyne railway station railway station code, in Australia
 Woodbridge (Amtrak station) railroad station code, in the United States
 Woodbridge railway station railway station code, in the UK
 a korean k-pop band